Juan Pedro de la Rosa (born August 7, 1986 in Tamaulipas, Mexico) is a Mexican professional boxer, and is the brother of welterweight boxer James de la Rosa.

Personal life
De la Rosa's father is Mexican and his mother is an African-American. His paternal grandfather played a pivotal role in his formative years and, as a tribute, De la Rosa wears his portrait in a lanyard around his neck just before and after every fight.

Professional career
De la Rosa turned professional at the age of 15.

The Contender
He was the youngest contestant on reality TV show The Contender at the age of 18. On the show, he was placed on the "East Coast" team and fought Tarick Salmaci in the second to last First Round fight. This bout of Youth versus Experience and was won by the young Mexican. Juan later drew criticism for allowing himself to be withdrawn from the competition with apparently minor injuries. His withdrawal left room for Ahmed Khaddour to strut his way back into the show.

Since starring on The Contender, De la Rosa's promise has somewhat diminished. Although he has continued to fight, his two losses to Mikel Williams have led some to question whether he has been a protected fighter. De la Rosa lost to Mexican veteran Fernando Vela via split decision at the Casa de Amistad in Harlingen, Texas in March 2008, returned a year later to defeat a solid journeyman Guadalupe Martínez. He was also scheduled to fight Glen Tapia on October 27, 2012 but pulled out 2 weeks before the fight citing an injury.

On November 2, 2013 De la Rosa finally made his return to the ring, after more than 4 1/2 years away from competition, in the co-main event at State Farm Arena, Hildalgo Texas. De la Rosa fought toe-to-toe with undefeated Anatoli Muratov until Muratov folded under De la Rosa's brutal body attack in the 5th round.

Professional boxing record

See also
Afro-Mexicans

References

External links

Boxers from Tamaulipas
People from Harlingen, Texas
1986 births
Living people
The Contender (TV series) participants
Mexican male boxers
Middleweight boxers
Mexican people of African-American descent